Store Måsvannet is a lake in Lebesby Municipality in Troms og Finnmark county, Norway.

See also
List of lakes in Norway

References

Lebesby
Lakes of Troms og Finnmark